John, Dauphin of France and Duke of Touraine (31 August 1398 – 5 April 1417) was Dauphin of Viennois and Duke of Touraine. He inherited the Dauphin of Viennois in 1415, following the death of his older brother, Louis. He died 5 April 1417, and was succeeded by his brother Charles.

Early life
John was born in 1398, the fourth son of Charles VI of France and Isabeau of Bavaria. At the age of four (in Paris on 5 May 1403) and again at the age of seven (in Compiègne on 29 June 1406), he was betrothed to Jacqueline, heiress of the County of Hainaut, Holland, Zealand, and Frisia. After his betrothal to Jacqueline, he was brought up alongside her at the castle of Le Quesnoy in Hainaut, at the court of his future mother-in-law, Margaret of Burgundy. This arrangement was made between his father and his future father-in-law to ensure his safety away from the tumultuous court in Paris, as well as to acquaint him with the lands which he would rule as husband of Jacqueline after her father's death. As he was the king's fourth son, he was only expected to succeed to his wife's lands, and was not expected to become king.

On 22 April 1411 the Pope gave his dispensation for the union and on 6 August 1415, when John was sixteen, he and Jacqueline married in The Hague.

Dauphin 
Four months after his marriage, John's elder brother Louis, Dauphin of France, died on 18 December 1415, and John became the next Dauphin of France.

Death 
John died on 5 April 1417 at the age of eighteen. What exactly caused his death is disputed. According to some, he died of the consequences of an abscess to the head, while other sources suggest he had been poisoned. He was buried in Compiègne's Saint-Corneille abbey. His younger brother Charles became dauphin and eventually king.

Ancestry

References

Sources

|-

|-

|-

1398 births
1417 deaths
14th-century French people
15th-century peers of France
Nobility from Paris
House of Valois
Dauphins of Viennois
Dauphins of France
Dukes of Touraine
Counts of Ponthieu
Dukes of Berry
Counts of Poitiers
John Dauphin of France
Sons of kings